Film Nagar, also known as Tinsel Town or Tollywood, is a neighborhood in the western part of Hyderabad, Telangana, India. It is notable for its place as the home of the entertainment industry, including several of Telugu cinema's historic studios. The area is majorly a part of Jubilee Hills and also a small part of Banjara Hills. The area is the headquarters of Telugu film industry, and the residential hub of many Telugu film personalities like Allu Arjun, Nagarjuna, Junior NTR, Brahmaji, Mohan Babu, Balakrishna etc. to name a few.

The area and the vicinity is home to some of the largest film production companies like Ramanaidu Studios, Annapurna Studios, Ramakrishna Studios, Padmalaya Studios, Sabdhalaya Theaters, Vaishno Academy, Vyjayanthi Movies, Sri Lakshmi Prasanna Pictures, Sri Venkateswara Creations, Fire Fly Creative Studios, and Makuta Graphics Studios. Shilpakala Vedika and Hyderabad International Convention Center, home to the Filmfare Awards South ceremony, are located in the vicinity.

Transport
TSRTC connects Film Nagar to other parts of Hyderabad. The closest MMTS Train station is at HITEC City and the closest Jubilee hills check post metro station is at Jubilee Hills

References

Neighbourhoods in Hyderabad, India